Binhai may refer to:

 Binhai County, a county of Yancheng, Jiangsu, China.
 Binhai New Area, a state-level new area in Tianjin.
 Binhai District, Dongguan, Guangdong, China
 Binhai Neighbourhood, which could refer to many neighbourhoods throughout China.